Marjory de Schireham (1290–1340), was a Scottish official. She was a custom collector in the city of Dundee and the first of her gender in that position in Scotland.

References
 The Biographical Dictionary of Scottish Women (Hardcover) by Elizabeth L. Ewan, Sue Innes
 https://web.archive.org/web/20160304034445/http://www.kosmoid.net/saltire/processionNSW
 Steve Boardman,Eila Williamson: The Cult of Saints and the Virgin Mary in Medieval Scotland

13th-century Scottish people
14th-century Scottish people
14th-century Scottish women
13th-century Scottish women